The Tree of Knowledge is a lost 1920 American silent drama film produced by Famous Players-Lasky and distributed by Paramount Pictures. It was directed by William C. deMille and starred Robert Warwick. It is based on an 1897 play, The Tree of Knowledge, by R. C. Carton.

In a prologue to the film involving a Garden of Eden scene, Yvonne Gardelle appears nude as Lilith to tempt Adam, who was played by dancer Theodore Kosloff. The two actors of the prologue were promoted in print advertisements for the film.

Plot
After living with adventuress Belle (Williams) in Paris, Nigel (Warwick) proposes, but she rejects him for a wealthier suitor. Nigel returns to England, where his friend Brian (Forman) hires him to manage his estate. Nigel falls in love with Brian's ward Monica (Hawley). Brian travels to Paris and meets Belle. Unaware of her past, Brian marries her, and, when they return to England, Belle says nothing when they meet her ex-lover Nigel. Belle, who had only married for money, then discovers that Brian's family is bankrupt, and begins an affair with Roupelle (Cummings). After Nigel discovers that she is planning to elope, he prevents the betrayal, but their prior affair is revealed to Brian. However, Monica forgives him for his transgressions.

Cast
Theodore Kosloff as Adam
Yvonne Gardelle as Lilith
Robert Warwick as Nigel Stanyon
Kathlyn Williams as Belle
Wanda Hawley as Monica
Tom Forman as Brian
Winter Hall as Siur Mostyn Hollingsworth
Irving Cummings as Loftus Roupelle
Loyola O'Connor as Mrs. Stanyon
Clarence Geldart as The Baron
William H. Brown as Swedle

References

External links

 
allmovie/synopsis
Exhibitor's Press Book with detailed plot, ads, and posters, at silentfilmstillarchive.com

1920 films
American silent feature films
Films directed by William C. deMille
American films based on plays
Lost American films
1920 drama films
Silent American drama films
American black-and-white films
1920 lost films
Lost drama films
1920s American films